Joachim Dehmel (born 27 June 1969, in Stuttgart) is a retired German middle-distance runner who specialized in the 800 meters. He represented his country at the 1996 Summer Olympics as well as one indoor and one outdoor World Championships.

Competition record

Personal bests
Outdoor
800 metres – 1:44.71 (Nurnberg 1996)
Indoor
800 metres – 1:46.35 (Stuttgart 1995)
1000 metres – 2:20.52 (Sindelfingen 1990)
1500 metres – 3:42.19 (Dortmund 1997)

References

All-Athletics profile

1969 births
Living people
Sportspeople from Stuttgart
German male middle-distance runners
West German male middle-distance runners
Olympic athletes of Germany
World Athletics Championships athletes for Germany
Athletes (track and field) at the 1996 Summer Olympics
Competitors at the 1995 Summer Universiade